Becco is an unincorporated community in Logan County, West Virginia, United States. Its population is included as part of the Amherstdale census-designated place.

The community is named for the Buffalo Eagle Colliery Company (BECCO).

References

Unincorporated communities in Logan County, West Virginia
Unincorporated communities in West Virginia
Coal towns in West Virginia